Zhangpu Confucian Temple is a Confucian temple located in Zhangpu County, Fujian, China.

History
Zhangpu Confucian Temple was first built in 1070 during the reign of Emperor Shenzong of the Song dynasty (960–1279), and went through many changes and repairs through the following dynasties. Now the existing Dacheng Hall was built in 1369 at the dawn of the Ming dynasty (1368–1644).

In 2006, it was listed among the sixth batch of "Major National Historical and Cultural Sites in Fujian" by the State Council of China.

Architecture
The Dacheng Hall faces the south. The hall in it has double-eave gable and hip roofs covered with yellow glazed tiles, which symbolize a high level in architecture.

References

Confucian temples in China
Buildings and structures in Zhangzhou
Tourist attractions in Zhangzhou
14th-century establishments in China
14th-century Confucian temples